The 2023 Ashes series (officially the LV= Insurance Ashes Series for sponsorship reasons) is an upcoming series of Test cricket matches to be played between England and Australia for The Ashes, in June and July 2023. The five venues will be Edgbaston, Lord's, Headingley, Old Trafford and The Oval. 

Australia are the holders of the Ashes going into the series, having won the last series 4–0. The series will form part of the 2023–2025 World Test Championship.

The series will be the 73rd Ashes series overall and the 37th to take place in England. This series will also mark the first time in the Ashes' 139-year history that no Test will take place in August, in an Ashes series hosted by England. The series was brought forward to June and July, so as not to clash with The Hundred tournament, due to start in August.

Squads

Matches

1st Test

2nd Test

3rd Test

4th Test

5th Test

References

External links
 Series home at ESPN Cricinfo

The Ashes
2023 in English cricket
2023 in Australian cricket
International cricket competitions in 2023